Cnemaspis agayagangai, the Agaya Gangai dwarf gecko, is a species of diurnal, rock-dwelling, insectivorous gecko endemic to  India.

The species name refers to the type locality, Agaya Gangai.

References

 Cnemaspis agayagangai

agayagangai
Reptiles of India
Reptiles described in 2022
Taxa named by Ishan Agarwal
Taxa named by Akshay Khandekar